Santa Coloma de Cervelló is a municipality situated in the comarca of Baix Llobregat, at the province of Barcelona, Catalonia, Spain. The town has 7081 people.

There are three urbanized zones in this town; the town centre, Colònia Güell area (which is around a former industrial colony) and residential districts. The Church of Colònia Güell, from the renowned architect Antoni Gaudí, is located here.

See also
 Local government in Spain

References

External links
 Government data pages 

Municipalities in Baix Llobregat